The United States Soccer Federation (USSF), commonly referred to as U.S. Soccer, is a 501(c)(3) nonprofit organization and the official governing body of the sport of soccer in the United States. Headquartered in Chicago, the federation is a full member of FIFA and governs American soccer at the international, professional, and amateur levels, including: the men's and women's national teams, Major League Soccer, National Women's Soccer League, youth organizations, beach soccer, futsal, Paralympic and deaf national teams. U.S. Soccer sanctions referees and soccer tournaments for most soccer leagues in the United States. The U.S. Soccer Federation also administers and operates the U.S. Open Cup and the SheBelieves Cup.

History

U.S. Soccer was originally known as the United States Football Association. It formed on 5 April 1913, at the Astor House Hotel in Lower Manhattan and on 15 August of that year was accepted as one of the earliest member organizations of FIFA and the first from North and Central America. The affiliation was originally provisional but during FIFA Congress in Oslo, Norway on 24 June 1914, the USFA, as it was abbreviated at the time, was accepted as a full FIFA member. The governing body of the sport in the United States added the word soccer to its name in 1945, when it became the United States Soccer Football Association; by this point, football as a standalone word had come to define a totally different sport in the U.S. It dropped the word football from its name in 1974 to become known as the United States Soccer Federation.

U.S. Soccer has hosted several global soccer tournaments, including the 1994 FIFA World Cup, the 1999 and 2003 FIFA Women's World Cup, and the Summer Olympic football tournaments in 1984 and 1996.

Headquarters and national training center
Originally based in Colorado Springs, Colorado, U.S. Soccer headquarters were moved to Chicago in 1991 under the leadership of former Secretary General, Hank Steinbrecher Called U.S. Soccer House, it is currently located in two refurbished mansions at 1801 South Prairie Avenue in Chicago.

In 2003, U.S. Soccer opened their National Training Center at Dignity Health Sports Park (then named Home Depot Center) in Carson, California. The $130 million facility includes a soccer-specific stadium, home to the MLS team Los Angeles Galaxy. Additionally, four grass soccer fields, a FieldTurf soccer field and a general training area are specifically dedicated to U.S. Soccer. Both the senior and youth men's and women's US national teams hold regular camps at Dignity Health Sports Park.

U.S. Soccer was also exploring a possibility of building the National Training and Coaching Development Center in Kansas City, Kansas. On 9 April 2015, the Training Center received final approval from the local governments. U.S. Soccer agreed to a 20-year lease, with the project set to break ground in 2016 and finishing some time in 2017.

Organization and governance
U.S. Soccer is governed by a board of directors that administers the affairs of U.S. Soccer. Cindy Parlow Cone, former 1999 FIFA Women's World Cup champion and long-time U.S. Soccer administrator, is the current president  while William Wilson, a sports agent for Wasserman Media Group, is the current chief executive officer and secretary general.

U.S. Soccer members are individuals and affiliate organizations. The national council is the representative membership body of the federation. It elects the president and vice president, amends the bylaws, approves the budgets, decides on policies adopted by the board, and affirms actions of the Board. The non-profit organization is a member of the worldwide soccer body FIFA and the North American soccer body CONCACAF, and also has a relationship with the U.S. Olympic Committee and the International Olympic Committee.

The federation convenes an annual meeting, usually held in February. Every four years, the annual meeting's attendees hold an election for the federation's president and vice president.

Members of the U.S. Soccer Federation
USSF recognizes the following members:

Professional Council 
 Major League Soccer (MLS)
 National Women's Soccer League (NWSL)
 North American Soccer League (NASL)
 United Soccer League (USL)
 National Independent Soccer Association (NISA)

Adult Council 
 United States Specialty Sports Association (USSSA)
 United States Adult Soccer Association (USASA)

Youth Council 
 United States Specialty Sports Association (USSSA)
 United States Youth Soccer Association (US Youth Soccer)
 American Youth Soccer Organization (AYSO)
 US Club Soccer
 Soccer Association for Youth (SAY)

USSF State Soccer Associations

Other affiliate members 
 American Amputee Soccer Association
 Armed Forces Sports Council
 United Soccer Coaches 
 United States Power Soccer Association (USPSA)
 U.S. Soccer Foundation
 United States Futsal Federation
 United States Specialty Sports Association
 United States of America Deaf Soccer Association (USA Deaf Soccer)

National teams

U.S. men's national team

The United States men's national team was assembled in 1885 to play Canada in the first international match held outside the United Kingdom. The team was invited to the inaugural FIFA World Cup in 1930 and qualified for the World Cup in 1934, finishing third place (semifinals) in 1930 out of 13 teams participating. In 1950 the United States scored one of its most surprising victories with a 1–0 win over heavily favored England, who were amongst the world's best sides at the time. The United States did not reach another World Cup until an upstart team qualified for the 1990 World Cup with the "goal heard around the world" scored by Paul Caligiuri against Trinidad and Tobago, which started the modern era of soccer in the United States. The 1990 men's national team was quickly disposed of at the World Cup, but nonetheless had qualified for its first World Cup in 40 years.

The United States hosted the 1994 FIFA World Cup, setting total and average attendance records that still stand, including drawing 94,194 fans to the final. The United States made a surprising run to the second round with a shocking victory over Colombia which saw Andrés Escobar, the player responsible for the United States' first goal (an own goal), later shot to death in his homeland. 1998 saw another disappointing addition to the history of the men's national team as it finished last out of the 32 teams that qualified for the World Cup. This embarrassment, which included a total collapse of team chemistry and leadership, led to the firing of manager Steve Sampson.

 The U.S. team hired Bruce Arena, who had won the first two MLS Cups in Major League Soccer history, and who went on to become the most successful United States men's national team manager in history. In 2002 Bruce Arena led a mix of veterans and MLS-seasoned youth to a quarterfinal appearance, dispatching contenders Portugal in Group D play and arch-rivals Mexico in the Round of 16, before losing a closely fought game with eventual runners-up Germany in the quarterfinal. The team looked to match or surpass that feat in 2006; the U.S. was drawn into Group E with Italy, the Czech Republic and Ghana. The United States lost to the Czech Republic 3–0 in their opening game, drew Italy, 1–1, in their second game (a match that saw two U.S. players and an Italian player red carded), and lost to Ghana, 2–1. The United States did not qualify for a knockout round, but were the only team to face eventual champion Italy without losing. In the wake of the team's disappointing performance, Arena's contract was not renewed.

Bob Bradley, Chivas USA manager and Arena's assistant manager with the men's national team, eventually succeeded Arena in 2007. The U.S. qualified for the 2010 FIFA World Cup in South Africa, winning the CONCACAF qualifying tournament. At the World Cup, the Americans tied England 1–1, tied Slovenia, 2–2. and then won their group in Group C by defeating Algeria 1–0 on a stoppage time goal by Landon Donovan. In the Round of 16, the United States played with Group D runners-up Ghana, and fell 2–1 in overtime (OT).

Entering the 2014 FIFA World Cup in Brazil, the U.S. team won all three friendly "send-off" matches leading up to the competition: 2–0, over Azerbaijan, 2–1, over Turkey, and 2–1 over fellow World Cup participant and defending African champions Nigeria. They were led at the time by Jürgen Klinsmann, who helped lead West Germany to victory in the 1990 World Cup and was the first player to score at least three goals in three consecutive World Cups. During the 2014 FIFA World Cup, the U.S. won their first match against Ghana, 2–1. Clint Dempsey scored in the first minute of the match giving the U.S. the early lead. Ghana did not respond until the 82nd minute scoring the equalizer goal. The U.S. then reclaimed the lead, thanks to John Brooks scoring the game-winning goal off his head just four minutes later in the 86th minute to regain the lead and take the match. The U.S. gained three points for their win and was off to a great start in the "Group of Death" claimed by critics for the teams the U.S. would have to go through in Group G (Germany, Ghana, and Portugal). The second match of the World Cup for the U.S. was a different story. Portugal claimed the early lead, with Nani scoring in the fifth minute to take the early 1–0 lead. It wasn't until the 64th minute until the U.S. scored the equalizing goal, thanks to Jermaine Jones, tying the match at 1 apiece. The U.S. then claimed the lead on a goal by Clint Dempsey again, scoring in the 81st minute to take a 2–1 lead. However, in the final minute of extra time, the world player of the year, Cristiano Ronaldo drilled a cross to teammate Silvestre Varela who headed in the tying goal, making the final score 2–2. The tie gave each team a point in the overall standings, bringing the U.S. to 4 points total, and gave Portugal their first point of the World Cup having lost their opening match to Germany, 4–0. The U.S. claimed a spot in the knockout round in spite of a 1–0 loss to eventual champion Germany in their final Group G game due to them winning the tiebreaker with Portugal. However, they bowed out the tournament in the round of 16 in a 2–1 loss to Group H winner Belgium. Goalkeeper Tim Howard helped the U.S. keep a 0–0 tie at full time. In extra time, there were two Belgian goals. The U.S. struck back with a goal by 19-year-old phenom Julian Green but could not manage another goal. Jürgen Klinsmann was let go after he has been fired as USMNT Director of Coaching and was replaced by Bruce Arena in November 2016.

The U.S. finished in fifth place in the Final round of the CONCACAF qualifying for the spot of the 2018 FIFA World Cup, which concluded in October 2017. In doing so, they marking the first time that the U.S. did not qualify for the World Cup since 1986. As a result of the fifth-place finish, Bruce Arena was let go as USMNT Director of Coaching later that month.

The U.S. qualified for the 2022 FIFA World Cup, played in Qatar, the first Middle East nation to host a World Cup. The 2022 FIFA World Cup was the first World Cup played in November and December, due to the extreme temperatures in June and July in Qatar. The United States played in Group B with Wales, England and Iran. The United States took a 1–0 lead with a goal from Timothy Weah and were looking good to get the three points when Walker Zimmerman fouled Gareth Bale in the waning minutes of the game. Matt Turner was unable to stop the penalty kick and the U.S. had to settle for a 1–1 tie in their first game. The U.S. went into the second group game against England as serious underdogs. The second youngest overall team in the tournament held the perennial powerhouse scoreless for 90 minutes plus stoppage time to secure America's second tie and put them in a have-to-win position for their game against Iran to make it to the knockout stage of the World Cup. Christian Pulisic scored a go ahead goal at the end of the first half, but paid a steep price with a pelvic contusion that would send him out of the second half and directly to the hospital where he watched the U.S. hold on to beat Iran 1–0. As the second-place team in group B, the U.S. would take on the Netherlands, winners of group A to open the knockout round at the 2022 FIFA World Cup. The U.S. lost to the Dutch 3–1 and were eliminated from the tournament.

The United States will co-host the 2026 FIFA World Cup, the first 48-team World Cup, with Canada and Mexico after beating out Morocco on June 13, 2018, in Moscow, Russia.

U.S. women's national team

The women's national team has won four FIFA Women's World Cup tournaments: 1991, 1999, 2015, and 2019. The team finished second in 2011 and third in 1995, 2003, and 2007. It has won Olympic gold medals at the 1996, 2004, 2008, and 2012 Summer Olympics. In addition, it has won seven titles at the Algarve Cup and six at the CONCACAF Women's Championship, the qualifying tournament for the FIFA Women's World Cup.

The inaugural FIFA Women's World Cup was held in 1991 in China. The U.S. women's national team was the first team to win the prize after beating Norway in the final.

In 1999, the United States hosted the FIFA Women's World Cup for the first time. During their tournament run, the women's national team established a new level of popularity for the women's game, culminating in a final against China that drew 90,185 fans, an all-time attendance record for a women's sports event, to a sold-out Rose Bowl. After neither team scored in regulation or extra time, the final went to a penalty shootout, which the United States won 5–4. The celebration by Brandi Chastain after she converted the winning penalty, in which she took off her shirt, is one of the more famous images in U.S. women's sports.

Youth national teams
U.S. Soccer Federation oversees and promotes the development of 14 youth national teams: 
U.S. Under-23 Men
U.S. Under-23 Women
U.S. Under-20 Men
U.S. Under-20 Women
U.S. Under-19 Men
U.S. Under-19 Women
U.S. Under-18 Men
U.S. Under-18 Women
U.S. Under-17 Men
U.S. Under-17 Women
U.S. Under-16 Boys
U.S. Under-16 Girls
U.S. Under-15 Boys
U.S. Under-15 Girls

U.S. Soccer Federation had ceased operations on its youth national team programming with the exception of the U-23, U-20, and U-17 teams on the men's side and the U-20 and U-17 teams on the women's side due to the COVID-19 pandemic in April 2020.

Extended national teams
As of March 2023, U.S. Soccer Federation supervises nine extended national teams across the disciplines of beach soccer, CP soccer, deaf soccer, futsal, and power soccer.

Coaches and technical staff

Men's coaches

Women's coaches

Extended teams' coaches

Technical staff

Refereeing staff 

Referee programs staff

Referee development staff

Professional leagues
Despite the growth of men's and women's professional soccer in the United States in the last few decades, by far the largest category of soccer in the United States, at least in terms of participation, is youth soccer. Though organized locally by organizations all over the United States, there are two main youth soccer organizations working nationwide through affiliated local associations. The United States Youth Soccer Association boasts over three million players between the ages of five and 19, while American Youth Soccer Organization has more than 300,000 players between the ages of four and 19. This makes soccer one of the most played sports by children in the United States.

Men

The professional first-division league in North America is Major League Soccer, which as of the 2022 season has 25 teams in the U.S. and 3 in Canada. The league began an aggressive expansion in 2017, with the goal of adding at least eight clubs. That effort has resulted in the addition of the following nine clubs: Atlanta United FC (2017), Minnesota United FC (2017), Los Angeles FC (2018), FC Cincinnati (2019), Inter Miami CF (2020), Nashville SC (2020), Austin FC (2021), Charlotte FC (2022), and St. Louis City SC (2023). The league operates as a single-entity league, which means MLS, and not the individual teams, holds the contracts on players.

The one sanctioned second-division men's outdoor soccer league is the USL Championship (USLC). Previously, the second North American Soccer League had second-division status, sharing it with the USL in the 2017 season, but the NASL was denied second-division sanctioning for 2018 due to considerable instability in the league; the league effectively folded at that time.

The USLC was sanctioned as the United States' lone Division II men's outdoor soccer league in 2018. Formed in 2010 as a result of the merger of the former USL First Division and USL Second Division, the USL Championship was sanctioned as Division III league from 2011 to 2016 before becoming provisionally sanctioned as a Division II league for 2017, and receiving full Division II sanctioning in 2018.

The USL Championship has expanded almost three-fold since its first season in 2011 to include 35 teams in the 2020 season, with the league divided into two conferences, Eastern and Western. The USLC is the world's largest Division II professional league by number of teams. Since 2014, valuation of USL Championship clubs have increased five-fold. In revenue, 2018 Championship clubs saw a 28% increase over 2017 numbers on an average of ticketing, sponsorship, merchandise, and ancillary revenue generation.

The USLC also holds a broadcast agreement with ESPN that sees 20 regular season games televised nationally on ESPN2, ESPNews and ESPN Deportes in addition to national broadcast of the USL Championship Final, which in 2019 was aired on both ESPN2 and ESPN Deportes. The league's remaining regular season games are broadcast nationally on ESPN+, with 22 of the Championship's clubs also holding local broadcast agreements. The USL Championship's broadcast agreement was made possible in large part by a major investment by USL with league technology partner Vista Worldlink to establish a USL Broadcast Center out of Fort Lauderdale, Fla.

The second NASL had no official tie to the former NASL that operated from 1968 to 1984, although some of the teams shared names with their historic counterparts. Unlike MLS that is a single-entity operation, the second NASL, like the old NASL, had no salary cap and players were contracted by the individual teams. The season was a split format (similar to that of many leagues in Latin America) that features seven teams, including one Puerto Rican team. Previous to the reorganization of the NASL in 2009, the USL First Division operated as the professional second-division league in the United States. However, a dispute among its teams and ownership led to the creation of the NASL which applied for and was awarded by USSF second division status. The 2010 season was played as a combined USL/NASL league format before NASL officially separated in 2011.

USL League One is sanctioned at the Men's Division III level. In March 2017, United Soccer League, administrator of the USL Championship and USL League Two, announced following the successful sanctioning of the USL Championship as a Division II league it would start a new tier in its professional structure, which became USL League One, and seek Division III certification for the 2019 season. The league received sanctioning in December 2018 and conducted a successful first season in 2019 that saw 10 teams compete in a single-table format and North Texas SC claim its inaugural league title. The seven independent clubs averaged 2,496 fans per match in 2019, placing League One in the top three of Division III leagues globally, and the league has expanded to include 12 teams for its second season in 2020, with further expansion expected prior to the 2021 season.

National Independent Soccer Association (NISA) led by former Chicago Fire general manager Peter Wilt plans on fielding 8–10 teams in 2018 and has stated that it will seek third-division certification.

A fourth-division league in the United States is the USL League Two, which as of 2015 is expected to have 58 U.S. teams, and six Canadian teams. Though League Two does have some paid players, it also has many teams that are made up entirely or almost entirely of college soccer players who use the league as an opportunity to play competitive soccer in front of professional scouts during the summer, while retaining amateur status and NCAA eligibility. Other fourth-division leagues in the United States are the United Premier Soccer League, National Premier Soccer League and Ligas Unidas.

In addition to MLS and the USL, the United States Adult Soccer Association governs amateur soccer competition for adults throughout the United States, which is effectively the amateur fifth-division of soccer in the United States. The USASA sanctions regional tournaments that allow entry into the U.S. Open Cup, the oldest continuous national soccer competition in the United States. Since 1914, the competition has been open to all U.S. Soccer affiliated clubs, and currently pits teams from all five levels of the American soccer pyramid against each other each year, similarly to England's FA Cup.

Women

The National Women's Soccer League (NWSL) is the professional, top-division league in North America and as of 2020, is composed of nine teams based in the U.S. The league has announced expansion plans for Racing Louisville FC in 2021 and Los Angeles' Angel City FC in 2022. Two professional, top-division leagues preceded the NWSL: the Women's United Soccer Association (WUSA), which featured many players from the 1999 FIFA Women's Cup-winning team (as well as other national teams), ran from 2001 to 2003 and Women's Professional Soccer (WPS) ran from 2009 to 2011.

Two second-division leagues currently exist: United Women's Soccer began play in May 2016 and as of 2020 features 30 teams in five conferences and the Women's Premier Soccer League (WPSL), started in 1997, features over 115 teams across the United States and Canada (the largest women's soccer league in the world as of 2020). Previously, the USL W-League was a semi-professional league that ran from 1995 to 2015 and featured a mix of college students and international players.

First Division

National Women's Soccer League (NWSL), 2013–present

On November 21, 2012, U.S. Soccer, in conjunction with the Canadian Soccer Association (CSA) and Mexican Football Federation (FMF), announced the formation of a new professional league for the 2013 season. The league, unnamed at the time of the initial announcement but later unveiled as the National Women's Soccer League (NWSL), launched in April 2013 with eight teams. Like WUSA and WPS, NWSL teams are privately owned with some owned by existing MLS teams. The American and Canadian federations pay the salaries for many of their respective national team members. U.S. Soccer initially committed to funding up to 24 national team members, with the CSA committing to paying 16 players and FMF pledging support for at least 12 and possibly as many as 16. In addition, U.S. Soccer housed the league's front office for the first four years, and scheduled matches to avoid any possible conflict with international tournaments. Four of the league's charter teams had WPS ties—the Boston Breakers, Chicago Red Stars, Sky Blue FC, and the Western New York Flash. The other four initial teams were located in the Kansas City, Portland, Seattle, and Washington, D.C. markets with the Portland team run by the Portland Timbers of MLS. The NWSL expanded to nine teams for 2014 by adding the Houston Dash, run by the Houston Dynamo of MLS. In 2016, it expanded to 10 with the addition of another MLS-backed team, the Orlando Pride. Ahead of the 2017 season, A&E Networks announced it had taken an equity stake in the league and Lifetime would begin broadcasting games to a national television audience. , additional expansion teams were being discussed by Los Angeles FC, Vancouver Whitecaps FC, and FC Barcelona, but none of these have yet materialized.

Several league changes occurred in advance of the 2017 season. First, FMF and U.S. Soccer amicably ended their partnership following FMF's establishment of its own women's professional league, Liga MX Femenil. The Western New York Flash ceased fully professional operations (though retaining its youth and, for a time, semi-pro operations), selling its NWSL franchise rights to Steve Malik, owner of then-NASL and current USLC side North Carolina FC. Malik relocated the NWSL team to NCFC's home of the Research Triangle and rebranded it as the North Carolina Courage. Both the Boston Breakers and FC Kansas City folded, with FCKC's player contracts transferred to Utah Royals FC, a new side owned and operated by Real Salt Lake.

The Seattle franchise went through two major changes in subsequent years. First, the team moved from Seattle to Tacoma and rebranded as Reign FC before the 2019 season. Then, in January 2020, the team was purchased by the parent company of French Ligue 1 power Olympique Lyonnais and rebranded again as OL Reign.

The league's next expansion was announced in November 2019, with a Louisville franchise granted to the ownership group of USLC side Louisville City FC, The Louisville side, which began play as Racing Louisville FC in 2021, is the first NWSL team whose entry into the league was announced more than 5 months before it started play.

Women's Professional Soccer (WPS), 2009–2011

The second professional league, Women's Professional Soccer (WPS), was founded in 2009. The inaugural season champion was Sky Blue FC, based in the New York–New Jersey area. The team defeated the Los Angeles Sol 1–0 at The Home Depot Center in Carson, California. The WPS launched with seven teams, all based in the United States. The Sol folded after the league's inaugural season, and two new teams joined for 2010, bringing WPS to eight teams. However, the 2010 season saw considerable instability, with another charter team, Saint Louis Athletica, folding during the season, champions FC Gold Pride folding after the season, and the Chicago Red Stars deciding to regroup in the second-tier Women's Premier Soccer League (WPSL). The 2011 season, in which six teams based along the East Coast played, was marked by low attendance for most of the season and conflict with Dan Borislow, who had purchased the former Washington Freedom, moved the team to South Florida, and renamed it magicJack. The dispute between WPS and Borislow led the league to suspend the magicJack franchise, with Borislow responding by suing. The legal battle led WPS to suspend its 2012 season, with hopes of returning in 2013, but WPS soon decided to fold completely.

Women's United Soccer Association (WUSA), 2001–2003

The Women's United Soccer Association (WUSA) was founded in 2001.  Headlined by the stars of the 1999 FIFA Women's World Cup-winning team, $30 million was initially invested by numerous cable TV networks and owners. The league's inaugural match was held between the Washington Freedom featuring Mia Hamm and the Bay Area CyberRays (featuring Brandi Chastain) at RFK Stadium in Washington, D.C. In addition to the 34,148 fans in attendance being greater than any MLS game that weekend, the Turner Network Television (TNT) broadcast reached 393,087 households: more than two MLS games broadcast on ESPN and ESPN2. The league folded in 2003.

Second Division

United Women's Soccer (UWS), 2016-present  
United Women's Soccer (UWS) began play in May 2016 and as of 2020 features 30 teams in five conferences across the United States.

Women's Premier Soccer League (WPSL), 1997-present 
Women's Premier Soccer League (WPSL), started in 1997, features over 115 teams across the United States and Canada (the largest women's soccer league in the world as of 2020).

USL W-League, 1995-2015 
The USL W-League was a semi-professional league that ran from 1995 to 2015 and featured a mix of college students and international players.

Controversies

Concussions
In 2014, parents and former players filed a Class Action Lawsuit against the United States Soccer Federation, FIFA, and other Soccer Organizations for failure to create policies that would prevent, evaluate and manage concussion injuries. Soccer is second only to American football in the number of concussion injuries per year.

MLS relationship
The USSF has been accused by representatives of the North American Soccer League, among others, of unfairly protecting MLS's leading role in American professional soccer. Among their concerns is that the USSF benefits from financial dealings with MLS that it does not have with other leagues, giving it an apparent incentive to protect MLS from competition. This includes the contract that the USSF has with MLS's Soccer United Marketing (SUM) subsidiary in which most USSF sponsorship, television licensing and royalty revenues (outside of its apparel deal with Nike, Inc.) are paid through SUM. The USSF reported $15,433,754 in revenues through the SUM relationship in its 2014 audited financial report.

In 2015, the NASL took issue with proposed USSF rule changes reportedly making it harder to gain co-equal "Division 1" status with MLS that would increase the NASL's influence within the USSF as well as presumably allow more access to international competition and larger media and sponsorship contracts, calling the draft proposal "...an anti-competitive bait and switch, with the purpose of entrenching MLS's monopoly position at the very time when the NASL is threatening to become a significant competitor." Seats on the USSF's Professional Council governing committee are also based proportionally on pyramid level, giving MLS more votes when choosing the two professional league representatives on the USSF's board of directors. In 2015, those representatives are MLS Commissioner Don Garber and Alec Papadakis, CEO of the United Soccer League that announced an affiliation with MLS in 2015.

International competitiveness
High-profile international soccer figures including former USMNT Head Coach Jürgen Klinsmann, former LA Galaxy head coach and USMNT Head Coach Bruce Arena and Manchester City manager and former FIFA World Coach of the Year Pep Guardiola, have expressed beliefs that the top-down structure of soccer developed and managed by the USSF in the United States, including pressure to have the best American players in MLS rather than higher-quality leagues in other countries, is hampering the nation's competitiveness in international soccer.

Conversely, Klinsmann has been criticized in turn by MLS representatives for recommending that American players leave MLS development systems to pursue professional careers in Europe in order to test themselves against higher levels of players in preparation for international competition. In 2015, MLS Commissioner Don Garber said, "I do believe our national team coach has a short-term objective. That's what he's hired to do. That doesn't mean next week, but it's to win the Gold Cup, it's to have the best possible team in 2018. And our goals and objectives are broader than that, and that's why we agree on some things but don't agree on others."

Women's national team lawsuit
On March 8, 2019, all members of the US women's national team collectively filed a gender discrimination lawsuit against the US Soccer Federation in a district court in Los Angeles. The lawsuit was filed due to claims that the athletes were being treated differently on the basis of gender, affecting their paychecks, the facilities they were offered, and even the medical treatment they received. Women on the team have previously filed complaints about pay disparity, including in 2016 when five members of the women's team filed a complaint with the Equal Employment Opportunity Commission.

On May 1, 2020, the district court dismissed the team's unequal and discriminatory pay claim, however preserving the players' claims about unequal treatment in areas like travel, hotel accommodations and team staffing. A trial on those issues is scheduled to begin June 16.

Judge R. Gary Klausner of the United States District Court for the Central District of California, granted the federation's motion for summary judgment. In his ruling, he dismissed the players' arguments that they were systematically underpaid by U.S. Soccer in comparison with the men's national team. According to Klausner, U.S. Soccer had substantiated its argument that the women's team had actually earned more "on both a cumulative and an average per-game basis" than the men's team during the years at issue in the lawsuit.

On February 22, 2022, the U.S. Soccer Federation agreed settle the lawsuit for $24 million, with a proposed $22 million going the players in the case and an additional $2 million to benefit USWNT players post-career goals and also charitable efforts related to women's football. The settlement also requires both male and female soccer players to paid equally for friendlies, and tournaments including the World Cup.

Reports

Garcia Report

On July 17, 2012, in the wake of announced anti-corruption reforms by Sepp Blatter, the president of the world association football governing body FIFA, the organization appointed U.S. lawyer Michael J. Garcia as the chairman of the investigative chamber of FIFA Ethics Committee, while German judge Hans-Joachim Eckert was appointed as the chairman of the Ethics Committee's adjudication chamber.

In August 2012, Garcia declared his intention to investigate the bidding process and decision to respectively award the right to host the 2018 and 2022 FIFA World Cup to Russia and Qatar by the FIFA Executive Committee. Garcia delivered his subsequent 350-page report in September 2014, and Eckert then announced that it would not be made public for legal reasons.

On November 13, 2014, Eckert released a 42-page summary of his findings after reviewing Garcia's report. The summary cleared both Russia and Qatar of any wrongdoing during the bidding for the 2018 and 2022 World Cups, leaving Russia and Qatar free to stage their respective World Cups.

FIFA welcomed "the fact that a degree of closure has been reached," while the Associated Press wrote that the Eckert summary "was denounced by critics as a whitewash." Hours after the Eckert summary was released, Garcia himself criticized it for being "materially incomplete" with "erroneous representations of the facts and conclusions," while declaring his intention to appeal to FIFA's Appeal Committee. On December 16, 2014, FIFA's Appeal Committee dismissed Garcia's appeal against the Eckert summary as "not admissible." FIFA also stated that Eckert's summary was "neither legally binding nor appealable." A day later, Garcia resigned from his role as FIFA ethics investigator in protest of FIFA's conduct, citing a "lack of leadership" and lost confidence in the independence of Eckert from FIFA.

In June 2015, Swiss authorities claimed the report was of "little value".

Yates Report
On October 3, 2022, the U.S. Soccer Federation publicly released the 173-page Yates Report, officially titled Report of the Independent Investigation to the U.S. Soccer Federation Concerning Allegations of Abusive Behavior and Sexual Misconduct in Women's Professional Soccer, the official report documenting the findings and conclusions concerning abusive behavior and sexual misconduct in women's professional soccer. The report is named for Sally Yates, the lawyer who led the investigation, a former Acting United States Attorney General.

Leadership

Current Board

Presidents
United States Soccer Football Association (until 1974)

United States Soccer Federation (1974–present)

Current sponsorships
Volkswagen
Nike
Allstate
AT&T
BioSteel
Bud Light
Chipotle
Deloitte
TRULY Hard Seltzer
Visa

See also

 American Football Association
 U.S. Soccer Athlete of the Year
 USWNT All-Time Best XI
 National Soccer Hall of Fame
 U.S. Soccer Development Academy
 USSF State Soccer Associations

References

External links

 
 U.S. at FIFA
 U.S. at CONCACAF

 
CONCACAF member associations
Association football governing bodies in North America
Sports organizations established in 1913
1913 establishments in the United States
Soccer in Chicago